Awkward turtle is a slang two-handed gesture used to silently mark a moment or situation as awkward. A number of spinoff hand gestures akin to the awkward turtle have since arisen (like the awkward palm tree, which even has its own Facebook page; awkward bell; awkward gong; awkward antlers; awkward tent; awkward turkey; and awkward turtle makes babies). The gesture is likely used in most cases playfully and ironically. Some have remarked that giving the gesture is a sort of celebration of social discomfort.

The gesture is believed to have originally come from sign language. It's the common gesture for "turtle" and "tortoise" in Auslan, and may also be in American Sign Language as the gesture for "sea turtle"—though people have disputed this, claiming it is actually the ASL sign for "platypus". The awkward turtle is gestured by placing one hand flat atop the other with both palms facing down, thumbs stuck out to the sides and rotating to look like flippers.

The term "awkward turtle" has transcended the gesture and is sometimes just stated, without the gesture.

Example usages

History

A student journalist reported on the ubiquitousness of the awkward turtle hand gesture at the University of Pennsylvania on 3 February 2006. By 2008, Facebook reportedly had more than 500 "awkward turtle" groups, the largest of which had more than 27,000 members. "A Way with Words", a public radio program about language, cited it as slang from UCLA during a segment on "awkward turtle" on 10 October 2009.

References 

Hand gestures